Fleming is an under-construction metro station serving Thessaloniki Metro's Line 1 and Line 2. The station is named after the Scottish scientist Alexander Fleming. During construction, a Roman cemetery and a small settlement were found, and it is designated as a low-importance archaeological site by Attiko Metro, the company overseeing its construction. It is expected to enter service in 2023.

This station also appears in the 1988 Thessaloniki Metro proposal.

References

See also
List of Thessaloniki Metro stations

Thessaloniki Metro
Railway stations in Greece